Estanislao Kocourek (born 5 March 1930) is an Argentine hurdler. He competed in the men's 110 metres hurdles at the 1952 Summer Olympics.

References

1930 births
Living people
Athletes (track and field) at the 1952 Summer Olympics
Argentine male hurdlers
Olympic athletes of Argentina
Athletes from Buenos Aires
Pan American Games medalists in athletics (track and field)
Pan American Games silver medalists for Argentina
Athletes (track and field) at the 1951 Pan American Games
Medalists at the 1951 Pan American Games
20th-century Argentine people